Route 357 is a collector road in the Canadian province of Nova Scotia. It is located in the Halifax Regional Municipality and connects Musquodoboit Harbour at Trunk 7 with Middle Musquodoboit at Route 224 .

It closely follows the Musquodoboit River.

Communities
Musquodoboit Harbour
Meaghers Grant
Gibraltar 
Elderbank
Middle Musquodoboit

Parks
Elderbank Provincial Park
Gibraltar Rock Provincial Park Reserve

See also
List of Nova Scotia provincial highways

References

Nova Scotia provincial highways
Roads in Halifax, Nova Scotia